Attitude Pictures Ltd is a New Zealand television production company who specialise in programmes relating to disability.

Activities

Attitude (TV Series)

The company has a flagship television programme titled Attitude, which has screened weekly on TVNZ 1 since March 2005. The television series focuses on character-driven content relating to disability and chronic health conditions. At least 540 programmes have been screened.

Paralympic Content
After almost a decade of following New Zealand Paralympians to international events, Attitude Pictures became the first production company to secure territory broadcast rights to a Paralympic event. Attitude secured the rights to the Sochi 2014 Paralympic Winter Games and livestreamed more than 50 hours of coverage via attitudelive.com.

Attitude also broadcast coverage of the Glasgow 2015 IPC Swimming World Championships, and partnered with TVNZ to produce the Rio 2016 Paralympic Games.

Special Olympics
In 2010, Attitude Pictures was selected by Special Olympics in Washington DC to be the official documentary production company for the Special Olympics Unity Cup. Attitude made documentary content before, during and after the Unity Cup match at the FIFA World Cup in South Africa. Attitude Pictures is also a recognised partner of Special Olympics in New Zealand and has produced several documentaries about athletes both in a sporting and social context.

AttitudeLive
In September 2013, Robyn Scott Vincent launched online broadcast platform, attitudelive.com. The site shows the company's catalogue of documentaries, livestream events (such as the Paralympics and the Special Olympics), provides information and resources relating to disability, and enables people to connect to one another.

The Attitude Trust
Established in 2008, The Attitude Trust is a registered Charitable Trust created to promote public awareness and recognise achievements of people who live with disability. In 2014 the Trust's focus expanded to encourage partnerships and initiatives with other organisations encouraging integration of people with a disability into political, social, economic and cultural life.

The Trust's flagship event is the Attitude Awards – a televised national celebration of achievements in the disability sector.  The inaugural award ceremony was in 2008. The various awards categories acknowledge the contributions and achievements of New Zealanders who live with disability. Proceeds from the event fund tertiary scholarships for people with a disability who are studying media and digital media. The Attitude Trust also raise funds to develop video resources not otherwise provided.

History
Founded in 1992, and then known as RSVP Productions, Attitude Pictures Ltd is based in Auckland, New Zealand.

References

External links
 https://www.attitudepictures.com
 https://attitudelive.com
 https://www.attitudeawards.org
 http://tvnz.co.nz/attitude/index-group-3416505 Attitude at TVNZ

Television production companies of New Zealand
2005 New Zealand television series debuts
2010s New Zealand television series
Television shows funded by NZ on Air
TVNZ 1 original programming